The Paygān (also known as Paighan) were the conscript light infantry unit within the Sasanian army and formed the bulk of its infantry force. The Paygan were sometimes referred to as being used as "cannon fodder".

During peacetime, the corps could have had police force roles.

Recruitment
The Paygan were a conscription force, recruited from the peasant population of the Sasanian Empire. According to the Chronicon Anonymum, the vast majority (120,000) of Sasanian Emperor Khosrow I Anushirvan's army of 183,000 was made up of Paygan. Despite being referred to as cannon fodders, the Paygan were frequently used in sieges and served as pages for the Savaran cavalry. They were also tasked to guard baggage trains, encroachment missions, and the excavation of mines. These troops would generally have had the lowest morale of all troops in the Sasanian army and would cluster together for mutual protection.

According to Arab historians, during the Battle of al-Qādisiyyah the Persian commander Rostam Farrokhzād refused to provide the Paygan troops with food and water the night before the battle. Instead, in the Arab camp, all soldiers there were being provided with supplies, including the peasants. This may be the reason why many of the Paygan soldiers in the army defected to the Arab side before and after the battle. In the Battle of Dara, for instance, the Paygan dropped their shields and abandoned the fields when the Savaran heavy cavalry was defeated.

Weapons
The Paygan were lightly armed with short light wood or wickerwork shields, boiled leather cap and short spears. Some of the Paygan would have, however, had to equip themselves with their own weapons. These tended to be agricultural equipment such as pitchforks, axes and sickles. The Paygan would have lacked decent armor, making them very vulnerable in hand-to-hand combat. They would have stood little chance against Roman troops. This is the reason why Sasanians developed their own heavy infantry to counter that of Rome's.

Belisarius' remarks on Sassanian infantry forces:

Ammianus Marcellinus, Rerum Gestarum, 19.7.3 remarks on Sasanian troops:

The professional Sasanian infantry and the peasant levies are often confused as a single force in Roman sources. Paygan's registration on the state's rolls suggest that they were a paid, professional force.

See also
 Spahbed
 Byzantine army
 Late Roman army
 Roman-Persian Wars* Persian war elephants
 Cataphract
 Aswaran

References

Infantry units and formations of the Sassanian Empire
Law enforcement agencies of Iran
Law enforcement agencies in Asia